Cinnamoyl-Coenzyme A is an intermediate in the phenylpropanoids metabolic pathway.

Enzymes using Cinnamoyl-Coenzyme A 
 Cinnamoyl-CoA reductase, an enzyme that catalyzes the chemical reaction cinnamaldehyde + CoA + NADP+ → cinnamoyl-CoA + NADPH + H+
 Pinosylvin synthase, an enzyme that catalyzes the chemical reaction 3 malonyl-CoA + cinnamoyl-CoA → 4 CoA + pinosylvin + 4 CO2
 Cinnamoyl-CoA:phenyllactate CoA-transferase, an enzyme that catalyzes the chemical reaction (E)-cinnamoyl-CoA + (R)-phenyllactate → (E)-cinnamate + (R)-phenyllactyl-CoA

References 

Thioesters of coenzyme A
Cinnamate esters